Renan Ferraro (born 22 January 1962) is a Brazilian former professional racing cyclist. He rode in the 1986 Tour de France. He also rode in the team time trial at the 1984 Summer Olympics.

References

External links
 

1962 births
Living people
Brazilian male cyclists
Brazilian road racing cyclists
Sportspeople from Rio de Janeiro (state)
Cyclists at the 1984 Summer Olympics
Olympic cyclists of Brazil